William Morris was a British sports shooter. He competed at the 1908 Summer Olympics winning a bronze medal in the team trap event.

References

Year of birth missing
Year of death missing
British male sport shooters
Olympic shooters of Great Britain
Shooters at the 1908 Summer Olympics
Olympic bronze medallists for Great Britain
Olympic medalists in shooting
Medalists at the 1908 Summer Olympics
Place of birth missing